Silk City may refer to:

India 
Dharmavaram, Anantapur district, Andhra Pradesh
 Ramanagara, Karnataka 
 Surat, Gujarat
 Chanderi, M.P.
 Bhagalpur, Bihar
 Bhoodan Pochampally, Telangana
 Berhampur or Brahmapur, Odisha
 Muddenahalli, Karnataka
 Kanchipuram, Tamil Nadu
 Arani, Tamil Nadu
 Salem, Tamil Nadu
 Mubarakpur, Uttar Pradesh
 Varanasi, Uttar Pradesh

Bangladesh 
 Rajshahi

Kuwait 
 Madinat al-Hareer (Silk City in Arabic)

United States 
 Manchester, Connecticut
 Paterson, New Jersey

Other uses
 Silk City (duo), British-American supergroup-duo
 Silk City Diners, a chain of American of diners from 1926–1966